Partners, Brothers and Friends is the sixteenth studio album by American country folk group Nitty Gritty Dirt Band. The album reached #9 on the US Country charts. The three singles from this album were top 10 on the US Country charts. "Modern Day Romance" went to #1, "Home Again in My Heart" went to 3, and "Partners, Brothers and Friends" went to 6.

Track listing

Personnel
Jeff Hanna – guitars and vocals
Jimmy Ibbotson – bass, guitars, mandolin, vocals
Jimmie Fadden – drums and harmonica
Bob Carpenter – keyboards and vocals
John McEuen – guitars, mandolin, fiddle, banjo and lap steel

Production
Producer – Marshall Morgan

Chart performance

References
All information is from the album liner notes unless otherwise noted.

Nitty Gritty Dirt Band albums
1985 albums
Warner Records albums